Shahrabad (also Romanized as Shahrābād) is a city and capital of Shahrabad District, in Bardaskan County, Razavi Khorasan Province, Iran. At the 2006 census, its population was 2,185, in 523 families.

References 

Populated places in Bardaskan County
Cities in Razavi Khorasan Province
Cities in Bardaskan County